Gonzalo Rodrigo Carneiro Méndez (born 12 September 1995) is an Uruguayan professional footballer who plays as a forward for Liga MX club Cruz Azul on loan from Swiss Super League team Sion.

Career
Carneiro started his professional career at Uruguayan club Defensor Sporting, making his debut in November 2015 and going on to make 39 league appearances for the club, scoring 13 goals.

On 2 April 2018, Carneiro joined Brazilian club São Paulo on a three-year contract.

Honours
Defensor Sporting
Uruguayan Primera División Apetura winner: 2017

References

External links

Living people
1995 births
Uruguayan footballers
Defensor Sporting players
Association football forwards
São Paulo FC players
Uruguayan expatriate footballers
People from Montevideo
Uruguayan Primera División players
Expatriate footballers in Brazil